This is a list of horror films that were released in 2020.

References

External links
 Horror films of 2020 on Internet Movie Database

 
2020
2020-related lists